Kyle Frank Clifford (born January 13, 1991) is a Canadian professional ice hockey forward currently playing for the Toronto Marlies in the American Hockey League (AHL) while under contract to the Toronto Maple Leafs of the National Hockey League (NHL). He was selected by the Los Angeles Kings in the second round (35th overall) of the 2009 NHL Entry Draft. Clifford is a two-time Stanley Cup champion with the Kings.

Early life
Clifford was born on January 13, 1991, in Ayr, Ontario, Canada. He began playing ice hockey after seeing his older brothers play the sport.

Playing career

Clifford began his minor hockey career with the Ayr Flames before spending six seasons with Cambridge Minor Hockey. He was eventually drafted by the Barrie Colts of the Ontario Hockey League (OHL).

He spent three seasons with the Colts, amassing 45 goals and 100 points in 184 games, also totaling 327 penalty minutes. During the 2009 NHL Entry Draft, he was selected in the second round, 35th overall, by the Los Angeles Kings. He was signed to an entry-level contract by the Kings on September 22, 2009. After the 2009–10 season, Clifford joined the Kings' American Hockey League (AHL) affiliate, Manchester Monarchs for the postseason.

Los Angeles Kings
In 2010, Clifford was among those invited to the Canada men's junior team training camp preparing for the 2010 championship. However, Clifford earned a roster spot with the Kings for the 2010–11 season. On December 9, he scored his first career goal in a 2-1 win over the Calgary Flames. His continued spot on the Kings prevented him from joining Team Canada for the 2010 championships. He primarily played on the fourth line role that could occasionally fight fight. In his second season, the Kings won the 2012 Stanley Cup, defeating the New Jersey Devils in six games. Clifford only appeared in three postseason games.

Clifford joined the Ontario Reign of the East Coast Hockey League during the 2012–13 NHL lockout, appearing in nine games. He returned to the Kings after the lockout, scoring 7 goals and 14 points in the abbreviated season and earned a new two-year contract with the Kings at the end of the season. The Kings once again won the Stanley Cup in 2014, defeating the New York Rangers in five games. Clifford (alongside Tyler Toffoli) assisted on the championship-winning goal scored by Alec Martinez in double-overtime. He appeared in 24 postseason games, scoring one goal and seven points. During the 2014–15 season he signed a five-year extension with the Kings.

During the 2018–19 season, while in his ninth season with the Kings, Clifford appeared in 72 games, producing a career high 21 points. His tenure with the team ended on February 5, 2020, as Clifford and Jack Campbell were traded to the Toronto Maple Leafs in exchange for Trevor Moore and third-round picks in 2020 and 2021.

During 7 of his 10 seasons with the Kings, he led the team in penalty minutes, with his rookie season of 141 being his highest total.

Toronto Maple Leafs and St. Louis Blues
He made his Maple Leafs debut on February 7 against the Anaheim Ducks. He scored his first goal with Toronto on February 18, 2020. He finished the season with the one goal and three points in 16 games with the Leafs.

As a free agent from the Maple Leafs, Clifford left to sign a two-year, $2 million contract with the St. Louis Blues on October 11, 2020. In his first season with the Blues, Clifford played in 50 games, registering 4 goals and 7 points. The following season, on November 15, 2021, after appearing in only two games, the Blues placed Clifford on waivers in order to reactivate Oskar Sundqvist, as the team would be $900,000 over the salary cap with him on the roster; Clifford on waivers would clear $1 million in salary cap space and allow the team to become salary cap compliant. Clifford cleared waivers the following day, and a few hours later was traded to the Toronto Maple Leafs in exchange for future considerations. He was assigned to the team's AHL affiliate, the Toronto Marlies. He was recalled from the Marlies on November 23 for the first time, and spent the season bouncing from the Maple Leafs and the Marlies. Clifford played in Game 1 of the 2022 Stanley Cup playoffs for the Maple Leafs against the Tampa Bay Lightning. During the game, Clifford was given a major penalty for boarding Ross Colton and was suspended for the following game. The Leafs were eliminated from the playoffs by the Lightning in seven games.

Personal life
Clifford and his wife Paige have three sons together.

Career statistics

Regular season and playoffs

International

Awards and honours

References

External links

1991 births
Living people
Barrie Colts players
Canadian expatriate ice hockey players in the United States
Canadian ice hockey left wingers
Ice hockey people from Ontario
Los Angeles Kings draft picks
Los Angeles Kings players
Manchester Monarchs (AHL) players
Ontario Reign (ECHL) players
Ontario Reign (AHL) players
People from the Regional Municipality of Waterloo
St. Louis Blues players
Stanley Cup champions
Toronto Maple Leafs players
Toronto Marlies players